At the 1988 Summer Olympics in Seoul, two events in synchronised swimming were contested, both for women only.

Medal summary

Medal table

References
 

 
1988 Summer Olympics events
1988
1988 in synchronized swimming
Synchronized swimming in South Korea